Space Coast Area Transit is the public transit system serving the communities in Brevard County, Florida.

In 2021, Space Coast Area Transit will undergo a rebranding effort with the name of the system changing to 321Transit as an homage to the countdown sequence that has launched numerous spacecraft from Cape Canaveral.

History 
Space Coast Area Transit was formed in 1985 as a replacement for two competing bus services in Brevard County; Brevard Transportation Authority and Consolidated Agencies Transportation System, both of which refused to cooperate with each other, and often got into territorial and service disputes.
 
The system budgeted $6.9 million for operations in 2010. It collected $2.1 million in passenger fees, The rest comes from federal and state grants, and contributions from two cities.

In 2014, from 1 to 2% of residents rode the bus daily.

Route list
There are 19 fixed bus routes running Monday through Saturday, with most routes running on an hourly basis.  The 4, 9, and 21 routes run on Sundays.

References

External links
Official website

Bus transportation in Florida
Transportation in Brevard County, Florida